The 1990 Triple J Hottest 100 was the second yearly poll of the most popular songs, according to listeners of the Australian radio station Triple J. From 1989 to 1991, listeners could vote for songs released in any year.

Full list

Artists with multiple entries

Seven entries
The Cure – (11, 19, 23, 25, 43, 67, 72)

Four entries
Hunters & Collectors – (2, 26, 32, 71)
The Smiths – (3, 7, 44, 53)
New Order – (5, 21, 65, 68)
R.E.M. – (9, 46, 78, 99)

Three entries
The B-52's – (8, 88, 97)
The Church – (14, 57, 92)
Pixies – (18, 34, 55)
Billy Bragg – (58, 59, 82)

Two entries
Joy Division – (1, 84)
The The – (4, 95)
The Stone Roses – (6, 51)
Sinéad O'Connor – (13, 69) 
The Go-Betweens – (27, 85)
Pink Floyd – (35, 95)
Prince – (37, 39)
Violent Femmes – (41, 87)
The Doors – (52, 62)
Elvis Costello – (63, 73)
Concrete Blonde – (76, 96)

See also
 1990 in music

References

1990
1990 in Australian music
1990 record charts